Stafford County is located in the Commonwealth of Virginia. It is one of the fastest growing, and highest-income counties in America. As of the 2020 census, the population sits at 156,927. Its county seat is Stafford.

Located across the Rappahannock River from the City of Fredericksburg, Stafford County is part of the Washington-Arlington-Alexandria, DC-VA-MD-WV Metropolitan Statistical Area. In 2006, and again in 2009, Stafford was ranked by Forbes magazine as the 11th highest-income county in the United States. According to a Census Bureau report released in 2019, Stafford County is currently the sixth highest-income county in America.

History
For thousands of years, various cultures of indigenous peoples succeeded each other in their territories along the Potomac River and its tributaries. By the time of English colonization, there were 32 Algonquian-speaking American Indian tribes in the present-day coastal Tidewater Virginia area, including those of the Patawomeck and numerous tribes that were part of the Powhatan Confederacy. The former small tribe, still centered in Stafford County, was recognized by the state of Virginia in 2010.

The Native Americans' first recorded encounter with Europeans in this area was in 1608, with John Smith of the Jamestown Settlement. During a time of recurring tension between the early English colonists and local Native Americans, the colonists led by Samuel Argall captured Chief Powhatan's daughter, Pocahontas, while she was living with her husband, Kocoum, at the Patawomeck town of Passapatanzy. The colonists took her from Passapatanzy, located in the eastern part of what is now Stafford County, to a secondary English settlement, known as Henricus (or Henrico Town). During her captivity there, Alexander Whitaker converted Pocahontas to Christianity. She took the name "Rebecca" at her baptism. Rebecca/Pocahontas married English colonist John Rolfe on April 5, 1614, in Jamestown. Their mixed-race descendants were among the First Families of Virginia.

The English colonial government of Virginia imposed its own order on the land and peoples. In 1664 it established Stafford County from territory previously part of Westmoreland County (which had been created from Northumberland County in 1653). It was named after Staffordshire, England.
As originally delineated, Stafford County included a much larger area than its current borders. As population grew, the following counties and jurisdictions were created: Arlington, Fairfax, and Prince William counties, and the City of Alexandria. It is part of the area now considered Northern Virginia.

George Washington spent much of his childhood in the lower part of the county at his family's home Ferry Farm (which at the time was part of King George County), along the Rappahannock River across from Fredericksburg. Colonial Forge High School was built on a tract of land owned in colonial times by his father Augustine Washington. George Mason, another Founding Father, also lived in Stafford during his formative years.

Aquia Church, built in 1757, is unusual among local structures for having been designed on the plan of a Greek cross rather than the more standard Roman Cross design. In addition, Aquia Church has a rare three-tiered pulpit; it has been designated as a National Historic Landmark. The Episcopal church continues to be active today.

Stafford County industry and resources were important to the colony and early nation. During the Revolutionary War, the Stafford ironworks furnished arms for the colonial rebel soldiers. Aquia Creek sandstone, quarried from Government Island, was used to build the White House and the U.S. Capitol.

During the American Civil War, the county was part of the battlegrounds, occupied repeatedly by more than 100,000 troops for several years. In 1862, before and after the Battle of Fredericksburg, some 10,000 African-American slaves left area plantations and city households to cross the Rappahannock River, reaching the Union lines and gaining freedom. This exodus and Trail of Freedom is commemorated by historical markers on both sides of the river, in Fredericksburg and in Stafford County. The Battle of Aquia Creek took place in the Aquia Harbour area. Both the Union Army and Confederate Army struggled to control the strategic Potomac Creek Bridge at various times during the war.

Falmouth, a town bordering Fredericksburg, was the home of late-19th century American Impressionist artist Gari Melchers. His house, Belmont, still stands and is listed on the National Register of Historic Places.

20th century to present

Stafford County has developed to be one of the core counties of the Washington metropolitan area and Northern Virginia, the seat of government and numerous major defense installations. Marine Corps Base Quantico, occupies northern areas of this county. The FBI Academy, FBI National Laboratory and NCIS HQ are located on the Stafford side of MCBQ. Many residents commute north to work there and in other defense and federal facilities, as well as private companies, in Washington and its environs on Interstate Highway 95, U.S. Route 1, and by Virginia Railway Express. Stafford County is a suburban county and home to many Washington D.C commuters and workers which work for the Federal Government. It is also home to many military families due to its proximity to MCBQ. These facts contribute to the high-income of families in Stafford County, and the high amount of home-ownership, and college graduates. Stafford County is also one of the few counties in America where black households make more than white households. In recent years Stafford County has experienced major suburbanization, and growth as more and more workers move to the suburbs for their families. Thus, many developers are currently active in Stafford County in housing and retail projects.

In the early morning hours of May 9, 2008, a tornado touched down in the southern part of the county, severely damaging about 140 suburban homes.

The county was severely affected by "Snowmageddon," the massive blizzards of December 2009 and February 2010. Stafford received some of the heaviest snow in the D.C. metropolitan area, with about 25 inches of snow in December, and 19 inches in February.

Geography

The Potomac River flows along part of the eastern border of the county, while the Rappahannock River runs along the extent of the county's southern border. The independent city of Fredericksburg developed at the fall line of the river, supporting mills run by water power. To the northwest of there is the Piedmont area. Aquia Creek empties into the tidal segment of the Potomac River at Brent Point in Stafford County. It is surrounded by Prince William County to the north, Fauquier County to the West, the City of Fredericksburg, and Spotsylvania County to the south. Due to its location and proximity to Washington D.C many Federal Government workers and commuters live in Stafford County. Stafford County’s location close to D.C, is one of the major reasons of the suburbanization and growth of the county

Major bodies of water
 Rappahannock River
 Potomac River
 Aquia Creek

Adjacent counties and independent city

Government and politics

The county is divided into seven magisterial districts: George Washington, Hartwood, Falmouth, Griffis-Widewater, Aquia, Garrisonville, and Rockhill. The magisterial districts, roughly equal in population, each elect one supervisor to the Board of Supervisors which governs Stafford County. The County operates under the county form of the County Executive system of government, with an elected Board of Supervisors. The Board hires a professional, nonpartisan County Administrator to manage government agencies. The current County Administrator is Thomas C. Foley. While Stafford County is currently Republican, due to its rapid suburbanization and growth of families, and Federal Government employees from D.C and being a part of Northern Virginia, it is turning increasingly Democratic. While the Board of Supervisors is dominated by Republicans which the Democrats have made strong gains to turn in the 2021 election, the School Board (officially nonpartisan) is a 3-3-1 split. Other signs of Stafford County turning increasingly Democratic are the Democratic pickups in the Virginia House of Delegates. In 2017 the Democrats flipped the 2nd District, running  Democrat Jennifer Carroll Foy, a fierce advocate of the Equal Rights Amendment. In 2019, the 28th was seen as a key district for Virginia Democrats to flip on their way to winning both chambers of the state legislature. The Democratic candidate in the 28th district won in 2019, helping the Democrats flip the Virginia House of Delegates. In 2020, Joe Biden became the first Democratic candidate to carry Stafford County since Jimmy Carter in 1976.

Stafford County is represented by Congresswoman Abigail Spanberger (D-Glen Allen) in the U.S. House of Representatives. On the state level, it is represented by Republican Tara Durant and Democrat Candi King in the Virginia House of Delegates.

Past Composition of the Stafford County Board of Supervisors

2003-2005

Republican incumbent Robert Gibbons from the Rockhill District won re-election after a failed state legislature race in which he lost in the primary. Democrat Peter Fields from the George Washington district won re-election to his second term. Independent Jack Cavilier ran for re-election and won in the Griffis-Widewater district, keeping the Board of Supervisors at a gridlock 3-3-1 partisan split.

2005-2007

Growth being a main concern of residents four incumbents lost re-election bids. Gary Snelings, a Republican from the Hartwood district lost re-election by 36 votes to Independent Joe Brito. Republican incumbent Mark Osborn lost re-election in the Falmouth district for a second term, to Democratic political newcomer George Schwartz. Democrats in the northern part of the county were replaced by Republicans. Gary Pash, a Democrat representing the Garrisonville District and Kandy Hillard a Democrat representing the Aquia District were replaced by Republicans Mark Dudenhefer and Paul Milde, respectively.

2007-2009

Peter Fields, the Democratic incumbent from the George Washington District declined to run for a third term. Harry Crisp, a Democrat who ran for the George Washington District beat, Tom Coen a Republican who also ran last election cycle against Peter Fields. Jack Cavilier, an Independent incumbent from the Griffis-Widewater district ran for re-election as a Republican and lost to Democratic newcomer Bob Woodson. Woodson made history as being the first African-American ever elected to the Stafford County Board of Supervisors. Republican Incumbent Robert Gibbons declined to run for another term. Republican Cord Sterling who worked for Senator John McCain (R-AZ) ran for the Rockhill District and won against a Democrat.

2009-2011

Independent incumbent Joe Brito lost a rematch with Republican Gary Snelings in a three-way race with another independent. Democratic incumbent George Schwartz from the Falmouth District, declined to run for re-election. Former Republican Supervisor Mark Osborn ran for the seat as an independent, in a three race against Democrat Doug Filler, and Republican Susan Stimpson who ultimately won. Republican Mark Dudenhefer won re-election against Democrat Laura Sellers and Republican Paul Milde won re-election against two Independents in a three-way race.

2011-2013

Republican incumbent Mark Dudenhefer from the Garrisonville District ran for state legislature and won. Republican Ty Schieber was named Interim supervisor and won a special election to finish out Mark Dudenhefer's term. Democratic Incumbent Bob Woodson from the Griffis-Widewater district declined to run for a second term. In a three way race former Independent Supervisor Jack Caviler won. Republican incumbent Cord Sterling won re-election in the Rockhill district. In the George Washington District Harry Crisp declined time run for re-election. Bob Thomas, a Republican won the race against a Democrat in the George Washington District.

2013-2015

The Republican incumbent from the Falmouth District Susan Stimson sought the Republican nomination for Lieutenant Governor of the Commonwealth of Virginia and lost. Meg Bohmke, a Republican representing the district in the school board ran to represent the Falmouth District in the Board of Supervisors and won. Incumbent Republican Ty Schieber lost re-election in the Garrisonville District against Democrat Laura Sellers who ran in 2009 against Mark Dudenhefer and lost. Republican incumbent Gary Snelings from the Hartwood District won re-election. Republican incumbent Paul Milde from the Aquia District also won re-election.

2015-2017

Independent Jack Cavilier ran for re-election as a Republican and won in the Griffis-Widewater District. Cord Sterling declined to run for re-election. Wendy Maurer a Republican won the Republican primary, then won a three way race against a Democrat, and longtime former Republican Supervisor Robert Gibbons who ran as an independent and won in the Rockhill District and won. Republican incumbent Bob Thomas won re-election in the George Washington District.

2017-2019

Republican Supervisor Bob Thomas from the George Washington District decided to run for state legislature. In a competitive Republican Primary he beat Supervisor Paul Milde from the Aquia District, and former Supervisor Susan Stimpson from the Falmouth District. Tom Coen, a Republican candidate who ran twice for the seat was named Interim Supervisor and won a special election as an Independent to finish out Bob Thomas’ term. Incumbent Republican Supervisor Meg Bohmke won re-election in the Falmouth District against a Democrat. Cindy Shelton, a Republican, beat a Democrat and an independent in a three way race in one of the most Democratic districts in Stafford County. Democratic Incumbent Laura Sellers from the Garrisonville District ran for re-election against Mark Dudenhefer who declined to run for re-election for state legislature. In a rematch Mark Dudenhefer won again to reclaim his seat by 13 votes. Gary Snelings, the Republican incumbent from the Hartwood District won re-election.

Stafford County School Board

Though the school board in Stafford County, and the Commonwealth of Virginia is officially nonpartisan, candidates are endorsed by parties and tend to hold views similar to these parties.

Law enforcement

The Stafford County Sheriff's Office (SCSO) is the primary law enforcement agency in Stafford County. According to the department, it is the first agency in Virginia to use drones solely for law enforcement purposes.

Presidential elections

Demographics

2020 Census

Note: the US Census treats Hispanic/Latino as an ethnic category. This table excludes Latinos from the racial categories and assigns them to a separate category. Hispanics/Latinos can be of any race.

2010 Census
As of the census of 2010, there were 128,961 people, 38,237 households, and 24,481 families residing in the county. There were 31,405 housing units at an average density of 116 per square mile (45/km2). The racial makeup of the county was 72.5% White, 15.6% African American, 0.4% Native American, 2.8% Asian, 0.10% Pacific Islander, 3.2% from other races, and 4.0% from two or more races. 9.2% of the population were Hispanic or Latino of any race. Due to the rapid suburbanization of the county the demographics have increasingly changed in the past 20 years and will continue to change in the near future as Stafford County continues to grow.

By 2005, Stafford County's population was 72.8% non-Hispanic whites. African-Americans were 17.0% of the total population. Native Americans were 0.4% of the county total, Asians 2.3%, and Native Hawai'ians and other Pacific islanders 0.2%. Latinos were 6.4% of the population. This was higher than the total for all of Virginia.

As of 2000 there were 38,187 households, out of which 46.90% had children under the age of 18 living with them, 68.00% were married couples living together, 9.30% had a female householder with no husband present, and 18.90% were non-families. 13.80% of all households were made up of individuals, and 3.40% had someone living alone who was 65 years of age or older. The average household size was 3.01 and the average family size was 3.32.

In the county, the age distribution of the population shows 31.60% under the age of 18, 7.80% from 18 to 24, 33.70% from 25 to 44, 21.10% from 45 to 64, and 5.90% who were 65 years of age or older. The median age was 33 years. For every 100 females, there were 101.10 males. For every 100 females age 18 and over, there were 99.50 males.

The median income for a household in the county was $75,546, and the median income for a family was $78,575 (these figures had risen to $85,793 and $95,433 respectively as of a 2007 estimate). Males had a median income of $47,080 versus $31,469 for females. The per capita income for the county was $24,762. About 2.40% of families and 3.50% of the population were below the poverty line, including 3.30% of those under age 18 and 5.30% of those age 65 or over. Stafford County is also one of the seven counties in America where black households make more than white households. Between 2010 and 2014 the typical black household made $105,628 in the county. The highest out of all the seven counties, while white households made an average $99,533.

Media

Stafford County being a part of the D.C area and Northern Virginia is covered by D.C cable news stations. These include FOX 5(WTTG), NBC 4(WRC-TV), ABC 7(WJLA-TV), CBS 9(WUSA), and PBS 26(WETA-TV). Stafford County is covered by northern Virginia newspapers and Fredericksburg newspapers.

Newspapers
 The Free Lance–Star
 InsideNoVa - North Stafford
 The Washington Post
 Potomac Local

Education

 
Virginia counties
Northern Virginia counties
Virginia counties on the Potomac River
Washington metropolitan area
1664 establishments in Virginia